Pacific Pearl may refer to:

Pacific Pearl Airways, an airline established in 2006 and operating in the Philippines
Pacific Pearl Company, a United States pearling company established in 1863 and dissolved in 1924
, a cruise ship launched in 1988 and operated by P&O Cruises Australia, sold to Cruise & Maritime Voyages in 2017 and renamed MV Columbus, and subsequently scrapped in 2021 during the COVID-19 pandemic.